The Falling Man is a photograph taken by Associated Press photographer Richard Drew of a man falling from the World Trade Center during the September 11 attacks in New York City. The unidentified man in the image was trapped on the upper floors of the North Tower, and it is unclear whether he fell while searching for safety or he jumped to escape the fire and smoke. The photograph was taken at exactly 9:41:15 A.M. on the day of the attacks.

The photograph was widely criticized after publication in international media on September 12, 2001, with readers labeling the image as "disturbing, cold-blooded, ghoulish, and sadistic". However, in the years following, the photo has gained acclamation.

Now regarded as a masterpiece in photojournalism, it is regarded as one of the greatest and most important pieces of art from the 21st century. A Time Magazine retrospective published in 2016 stated "Falling Man’s identity is still unknown, but he is believed to have been an employee at the Windows on the World restaurant, which sat atop the north tower. The true power of Falling Man, however, is less about who its subject was and more about what he became: a makeshift Unknown Soldier in an often unknown and uncertain war, suspended forever in history."

Background

Of the 2,606 victims killed inside the Twin Towers and on the ground in New York City during the September 11 attacks, some have estimated that at least 200 people fell to their deaths from the burning towers, while other estimates put the number around 100. All but three were witnessed falling from the North Tower, where considerably more people were trapped on far fewer floors. Most of the people who fell from the World Trade Center were jumpers who had no choice but to commit suicide by deliberately leaping to their deaths from hundreds of feet in the air as their only means of escaping the extreme heat, smoke and flames, although a much smaller percentage of the deaths were accidents caused by people losing their grip or being knocked off balance near window ledges. Officials could not recover or identify the bodies of those forced out of the towers prior to their collapse. The New York City medical examiner's office said it does not classify them as "jumpers," explaining that a 'jumper' is defined as someone who "goes to the office in the morning knowing that they will commit suicide," adding that the victims who fell from the towers did not want to die but "were forced out by the smoke and flames or blown out."

The morning of September 11, Richard Drew was on assignment for the Associated Press, photographing a maternity fashion show in Bryant Park. Alerted by his editor to the attacks, Drew took the subway to the Chambers Street subway station, near the World Trade Center site. He took the falling man image while at the corner of West and Vesey Street from a low angle. He took eight photographs in sequence, after realizing that a series of loud cracking sounds was not that of falling concrete, but rather people hitting the ground. He took between ten and twelve different sequences of images of people jumping from the tower, before having to leave the site due to the South Tower's collapse.

The man fell from the south side of the North Tower's west face. Thus, the left half of the backdrop features the North Tower while the South Tower is visible on the right. The photograph gives the impression that the man is falling straight down; however, a series of photographs taken of his fall shows him to be tumbling through the air.

Publication history
The photograph initially appeared in newspapers around the world, including on page seven of The New York Times on September 12, 2001. The photo's caption read, "A person falls headfirst after jumping from the north tower of the World Trade Center. It was a horrific sight that was repeated in the moments after the planes struck the towers." It appeared only once in the Times because of criticism and anger against its use. Six years later, it appeared on page 1 of The New York Times Book Review on May 27, 2007.

Identification

The identity of the subject of the photograph has never been officially confirmed. The large number of people trapped in the tower has made identifying the man in the 12 photos difficult.

Norberto Hernandez
After seeing a missing persons poster, reporter Peter Cheney suggested in the Canadian national newspaper The Globe and Mail that the man pictured in the photo may have been Norberto Hernandez, a pastry chef at Windows on the World, a restaurant located on the 106th floor of the North Tower. Some members of Hernandez's family initially agreed with Cheney, but after examining the entire photo sequence and noting details of his clothing, they were no longer convinced.

Jonathan Briley
"The Falling Man", an article about the photograph by American journalist Tom Junod, was published in the September 2003 issue of Esquire magazine. It was adapted into a documentary film by the same name. The article gave the possible identity of the falling man as Jonathan Briley, a 43-year-old sound engineer who worked at Windows on the World. Briley had asthma and would have known he was in danger when smoke began to pour into the restaurant. He was initially identified by his brother, Timothy. Michael Lomonaco, the restaurant's executive chef, also suggested that the man was Briley based on his body type and clothes. In one of the photos, the Falling Man's shirt or white jacket was blown open and up, revealing an orange t-shirt similar to one shirt that Briley often wore. Briley's older sister Gwendolyn also suggested that he could be the victim. She told reporters of The Sunday Mirror, "When I first looked at the picture ... and I saw it was a man—tall, slim—I said, 'If I didn't know any better, that could be Jonathan. Briley's remains were recovered the day after 9/11. Jonathan Briley was brother to Alexander Briley, a member of the band Village People.

Other uses
9/11: The Falling Man is a 2006 documentary film about the photo. It was made by American filmmaker Henry Singer and filmed by Richard Numeroff, a New York-based director of photography. The film is loosely based on Junod's Esquire story. It also drew its material from photographer Lyle Owerko's pictures of falling people. It debuted on March 16, 2006, on the British television network Channel 4, later made its North American premiere on Canada's CBC Newsworld on September 6, 2006, and has been broadcast in more than 30 countries. The U.S. premiere was September 10, 2007, on the Discovery Times Channel.

The novel Falling Man, by Don DeLillo, is about the September 11 attacks. The "falling man" in the novel is a performance artist recreating the events of the photograph. DeLillo says he was unfamiliar with the title of the picture when he named his book. The artist straps himself into a harness and jumps from an elevated structure in a high visibility area (such as a highway overpass), hanging in the pose of The Falling Man.

In July 2022, GameStop received controversy for allowing a non-fungible token titled Falling Man to be listed on their newly-launched NFT platform. The digital image depicted an astronaut falling in a pose and background replicating Drew's photograph, and was provided the seller's description "This one probably fell from the MIR station", referencing the 1997 crash of Spektr. The NFT was later delisted from the platform.

See also
 Impending Death
 List of photographs considered the most important

References
Citations

Sources
 9/11: The Falling Man (March 16, 2006). Channel 4.

Further reading

External links
 NPR interview with Esquire magazine writer Tom Junod, August 21, 2003
 

2001 works
2001 in art
2001 in New York City
American terrorism victims
Associated Press
Male murder victims
People murdered in New York City
Photographs of the United States
Color photographs
September 11 attacks
Works originally published in The New York Times
World Trade Center
Terrorism deaths in New York (state)
Victims of the September 11 attacks
2000s photographs
Unidentified people
People notable for being the subject of a specific photograph
Unidentified murder victims in New York (state)
Unidentified American people